The Shire of Wagin is a local government area in the Wheatbelt region of Western Australia, about  southeast of the state capital, Perth.

History

It was first established as the Arthur Road District on 10 February 1887. It was renamed the Wagin Road District on 10 February 1905.

The Wagin township was severed from the road district as the Municipality of Wagin on 27 July 1906,  but was amalgamated back into the road district on 15 April 1961, with the creation of a new Town Ward.

It was declared a shire and named the Shire of Wagin with effect from 1 July 1961 following the passage of the Local Government Act 1960, which reformed all remaining road districts into shires.

Wards
The shire was divided into wards until 1991, but wards were abolished and councillors now sit at large.  there were 11 councillors.

Towns and localities
The towns and localities of the Shire of Wagin with population and size figures based on the most recent Australian census:

Population

Notable councillors
 Charles Piesse, Arthur Roads Board chairman 1887–1890; later a state MP
 Winifred Piesse, Shire of Wagin councillor 1971–1977; later a state MP

Heritage-listed places

As of 2023, 92 places are heritage-listed in the Shire of Wagin, of which eight are on the State Register of Heritage Places.

References

External links
 

Wagin